Lobulia is a genus of skinks in the subfamily Eugongylinae. The genus Lobulia is endemic to New Guinea.

Species
There are 7 species:
Lobulia brongersmai (Zweifel, 1972) - Brongersma's lobulia
Lobulia elegans (Boulenger, 1897) - elegant lobulia 
Lobulia fortis Slavenko, Tamar, Tallowin, Kraus, Allison, Carranza, & Meiri, 2021
Lobulia huonensis Slavenko, Tamar, Tallowin, Kraus, Allison, Carranza, & Meiri, 2021
Lobulia lobulus (Loveridge, 1945) - elegant lobulia 
Lobulia marmorata Slavenko, Tamar, Tallowin, Kraus, Allison, Carranza, & Meiri, 2021
Lobulia vogelkopensis Slavenko, Tamar, Tallowin, Kraus, Allison, Carranza, & Meiri, 2021

Nota bene: A binomial authority in parentheses indicates that the species was originally described in a genus other than Lobulia.

References

Further reading
Greer AE Jr (1974). "The generic relationships of the scincid lizard genus Leiolopisma and its relatives". Australian Journal of Zoology, Supplementary Series (31): 1-67. (Lobulia, new genus, pp. 9–10 + Figures 4, 19, 41, 43).

 
Skinks of New Guinea
Lizard genera
Endemic fauna of New Guinea
Taxa named by Allen Eddy Greer